The Carter Allen House, near Smiths Grove, Kentucky, was built in 1870.  It was listed on the National Register of Historic Places in 1979.

It is a two-story five-bay brick building with elements of Greek Revival architecture.

References

National Register of Historic Places in Warren County, Kentucky
Greek Revival houses in Kentucky
Houses completed in 1870
1870 establishments in Kentucky
Houses in Warren County, Kentucky
Houses on the National Register of Historic Places in Kentucky